Reginhild (minor planet designation: 574 Reginhild) is a minor planet orbiting the Sun that was discovered by German astronomer Max Wolf on September 19, 1905. The name may have been inspired by the asteroid's provisional designation 1905 RD.

Photometric observations of this asteroid at the Organ Mesa Observatory in Las Cruces, New Mexico during 2010 gave a light curve with a period of 14.339 ± 0.001 hours and a brightness variation of 0.17 ± 0.02 in magnitude. The light curve shows three uneven minimums and maximums per rotation cycle.

References

External links
 
 

Background asteroids
Reginhild
Reginhild
S-type asteroids (Tholen)
19050919